Darius is a male given name. Etymologically, it is the English-language transliteration of the Persian name Dariush.

Origin and meaning

 
 
 Elamite: 
 Akkadian: 

Shorter forms include:

 Latin: 
 Ancient Greek:  
 
 Elamite: 
 Akkadian: 
 Egyptian:

Notable people with the given name "Darius" include

Historical people
Darius I (the Great) (521–486 BCE), Persian king
Darius II (423–404 BCE), Persian king
Darius III (Codomannus) (336–330 BCE), Persian king
Darius I of Media Atropatene, Persian prince
Darius Painter, Italian vase painter
Darius of Pontus, Persian monarch
Darius the Magnificent, Mughal prince
Darius the Mede, King of Babylon
Darius (praetorian prefect), Praetorian prefect of the East in 436 to 437 CE

A
Darius Aučyna (born 1989), Lithuanian long jumper
Darius Adamczyk (born 1966), American businessman
Darius Adams (born 1989), Bulgarian-American basketball player
Darius Allen (born 1992), American football player
Darius Anderson (born 1997), American football player

B
Darius Baker (1845–1926), Justice of the Rhode Island Supreme Court 
Darius L. Bancroft (1819–??), American politician
Darius Bazley (born 2000), American basketball player
Darius Bea (1913–2001), American baseball player
Darius Blandford (1843–1917), Canadian blacksmith
Darius Botha (1955–2018), South African rugby union footballer
Darius Boyd (born 1987), Australian rugby league footballer
Darius Bradwell (born 1997), American football player
Darius Florin Brăguși (born 1993), Romanian tennis player
Darius Brooks (born 1963), American musician
Darius Brown (disambiguation), multiple people
Darius Brubeck (born 1947), American musician
Darius Buia (born 1994), Romanian footballer
Darius Butkus (born 1972), Lithuanian footballer
Darius Butler (born 1986), American football player

C
Darius Campbell (1980–2022), Scottish singer-songwriter
Darius Charles (born 1987), English footballer
Darius Ciraco (born 1996), Canadian football player
Darius Clark (1798–1871), American physician and politician
Darius Clemons (born 1960), American basketball player
Darius Cobb (1834–1919), American painter
Darius N. Couch (1822–1897), American soldier
Darius Cox (born 1983), Bermudian footballer
Darius Crosby (1768–1818), American politician
Darius Crouter (1827–1910), Canadian minister
Dárius Csillag (born 1995), Hungarian footballer

D
Darius Campbell Danesh (1980-2022), Scottish pop star
Darius Paul Dassault (1882–1969), French general
Darius Days (born 1999), American basketball player
Darius Defoe (born 1984), British basketball player
Darius Degutis, Lithuanian diplomat
Darius de Haas (born 1968), American actor
Darius Dhlomo (1931–2015), South African footballer
Darius Dimavičius (born 1968), Lithuanian basketball player
Darius Draudvila (born 1983), Lithuanian decathlon athlete
Darius D'Silva (born 1998), Emirati cricketer
Darius D'Souza (born 1989), Indian-Canadian cricketer

E
Darius Elias, Canadian politician
Darius Eubanks (born 1991), American football player

F
Darius Fisher, British film producer
Darius Fleming (born 1989), American football player

G
Darius Garland (born 2000), American basketball player
Darius Goff (1809–1891), American textile manufacturer
Darius Grala (born 1964), Polish sports car racing driver
Darius Gray (born 1945), American religious speaker
Darius Grigalionis (born 1977), Lithuanian swimmer
Darius Grosu (born 2002), Romanian footballer
Derrius Guice (born 1997), American football player
Darius Guppy (born 1964), Anglo–Iranian businessman
Darius Gvildys (born 1970), Lithuanian footballer

H
Darius Hadley (born 1973), American football player
Darius Haili, Papua New Guinean rugby league footballer
Darius Hamilton (born 1993), American football player
Darius Hanks (born 1989), American football player
Darius D. Hare (1843–1897), American soldier
Darius Harper (born 1997), American football player
Darius Harris (born 1996), American football player
Darius Helton (1954–2006), American football player
Darius Henderson (born 1981), English footballer
Darrius Heyward-Bey (born 1987), American football player
Darius Hill (born 1985), American football player
Darius Hillary (born 1993), American football player
Darius Hodge (born 1998), American football player
Darius Holbert (born 1974), American musician
Darius Holland (born 1973), American football player

I
Darius Ishaku (born 1954), Nigerian architect

J
Darius Jackson (born 1993), American football player
Darius James (born 1954), American author and performance artist
Darius Jennings (born 1992), American football player
Darius Johnson (disambiguation), multiple people
Darius Johnson-Odom (born 1989), American basketball player
Darius Jokarzadeh (born 1993), Welsh weightlifter
Darius Jones (disambiguation), multiple people

K
Darius Kaiser (born 1961), Polish-German cyclist
Darius Kaleb, American actor
Darius Kampa (born 1977), German footballer
Darius Kasparaitis (born 1972), Lithuanian–American ice hockey player
Darius Kazemi (born 1983), American computer programmer
Darius Khondji (born 1955), French-Iranian cinematographer
Darius Kilgo (born 1991), American football player
Darius Kinsey (1869–1945), American photographer
Darius Knight (born 1990), English table tennis player
Darius Koski (born 1971), American guitarist

L
Darius Labanauskas (born 1971), Lithuanian darts player
Darius Latham (born 1994), American football player
Darius Shaquille Leonard (born 1995), American football player
Darius Lewis (born 1999), American-Trinidadian footballer
Darius Lukminas (born 1968), Lithuanian basketball player

M
Darius Maciulevičius (born 1973), Lithuanian football midfielder
Darius Madison (born 1994), American soccer player
Darius Magdišauskas (born 1969), Lithuanian footballer
Darius Makaria (born 1993), Romanian handballer
Darius Marder, American film director
Darius Marshall (born 1989), American football player
Darius Martin (born 1999), American professional wrestler
Darius Maskoliūnas (born 1971), Lithuanian basketball player
Darius Mažintas (born 1982), Lithuanian politician
Darius Msagha Mbela, Kenyan politician
Darius McCollum (born 1965), American bus driver
Darius McCrary (born 1976), American actor
Darius McGhee (born 1999), American basketball player
Darius Mead (1787–1864), American politician
Darius Mead (Michigan politician) (1798–1859), American politician
Darius Miceika (born 1983), Lithuanian footballer
Darius Miles (born 1981), American basketball player
Darius Milhaud (1892–1974), French composer
Darius Miller (born 1990), American basketball player
Darius Miller (railroad president) (1859–1914), American railway executive
Darius Ogden Mills (1825–1910), American banker and philanthropist
Darius Juozas Mockus (born 1965), Lithuanian entrepreneur
Darius Clark Monroe (born 1980), American writer
Darius A. Monsef IV (born 1981), American entrepreneur
Darius Moon (1851–1939), American architect
Darius A. Moore (1833–1905), American merchant and politician
Darius Morris (born 1991), American basketball player
Darius Muasau (born 2001), American football player
Darius Mutamba (born 1991), Zimbabwean visual artist

N
Darius Nggawa (1929–2008), Indonesian bishop

O
Darius A. Ogden (1813–1889), American lawyer and politician
Darius Olaru (born 1998), Romanian footballer
Darius Osei (born 1996), English footballer

P
Darius Paul (born 1994), American basketball player
Darius J. Pearce (born 1972), Jersey politician
Darius Perkins (1964–2019), Australian actor
Darius Perry (born 1999), American basketball player
Darius Phillips (born 1996), American football player
Darius Philon (born 1994), American football player
Darius Powe (born 1994), American football player
Darius Prince (born 1990), American football player

Q
Darius Quimby (died 1791), American police officer

R
Darius Rafat (born 1977), Canadian producer
Darius Regelskis (born 1976), Lithuanian footballer
Darius Rejali (born 1959), Iranian-American political scientist
Darius Reynaud (born 1984), American football player
Darius Reynolds (born 1989), American football player
Darius Rice (born 1982), American basketball player
Darius Rochebin (born 1966), Iranian-Swiss journalist
Darius Roy (born 1998), American basketball player
Darius Rucker (born 1966), American musician
Darius Rush (born 2000), American football player
Dárius Rusnák (born 1959), Slovak ice hockey player
Darius Ruželė (born 1968), Lithuanian chess player

S
Darius Sanajevas (born 1977), Lithuanian footballer
Darius Sanders (born 1983), American football player
Darius Scholtysik (born 1966), German footballer
Darius Scott (born 1993), American singer-songwriter
Darius Semaña (born 1973), Filipino guitarist
Darius Sessions (1717–1809), British politician
Darius Shu (born 1994), British cinematographer
Darius Šilinskis (born 1984), Lithuanian basketball player
Darius Sinathrya (born 1985), Swiss-Indonesian actor
Darius Sirtautas (born 1970), Lithuanian basketball player
Darius Škarnulis (born 1977), Lithuanian race walker
Darius Slay (born 1991), American football player
Darius Slayton (born 1997), American football player
Darius S. Smith (1833–1913), American politician
Darius Songaila (born 1978), Lithuanian basketball player
Darius Stills (born 1998), American football player
Darius Strolė (born 1974), Lithuanian cyclist

T
Darius Taylor (born 1978), American basketball coach
Darius Theus (born 1990), American basketball player
Darius Thompson (born 1995), American basketball player

V
Darius Vâlcov (born 1977), Romanian politician
Darius Van Arman, American businessman
Darius van Driel (born 1989), Dutch golfer
Darius Vassell (born 1980), English footballer
Darius Victor (born 1994), American football player
Darius Vinnett (born 1984), American football player

W
Darius Walker (born 1985), American football player
Darius B. Warner (1832–1917), American army officer
Darius Washington Jr. (born 1985), Macedonian-American basketball player
Darius Watts (born 1981), American football player
Darius White (born 1992), American football player
Darius Williams (born 1998), American football player

Y
Darius Young (1938–2021), American sharpshooter
Darius Yuen (born 1969), Hong Kong banker

Z
Darius Zagorskis (born 1969), Lithuanian chess Grandmaster
Darius Žutautas (born 1978), Lithuanian footballer

Surname
Adam Darius (1930–2017), American dancer
Claudia Darius, German soprano
Donovin Darius (born 1975), American football player
Eric Darius (born 1982), American saxophonist
Steponas Darius (1896–1933), Lithuanian-American pilot
Vincent Darius (1955–2016), Grenadian bishop

Fictional characters
Darius (Highlander), an Immortal from Highlander: The Series
Darius, a character from Fullmetal Alchemist
Darrius, a character from Mortal Kombat
Darius, a character from Need for Speed: Carbon
Darius, the Hand of Noxus, a playable champion character in the multiplayer online battle arena video game League of Legends
Darius, a character from The Hunger Games
Darius, the wolf character from the Patrick Carman books The Land of Elyon
Darius Britt, the female main character from Safety Not Guaranteed
Darius, main character from Party Hard (video game)
Darius, character from the Assassin's Creed franchise
Darius, character from the TV show Atlanta (TV series)
Darius Bowman, the main protagonist from the TV series Jurassic World Camp Cretaceous
Darius Kincade, a character from The Hitman's Bodyguard
Darius Silva Ganius, prime minister from the Mushoku Tensei

See also
 Darius (horse) (1951–1968), British Thoroughbred racehorse
 Dara, Darab, the New Persian forms of the word
 Daria
 Dario

References

Lithuanian masculine given names
Persian masculine given names